Big Springs is an unincorporated community in Coconino County, Arizona, United States.

The Big Springs Lookout Tower and Big Springs Ranger Station, which are both listed on the National Register of Historic Places, are located near Big Springs.

The Big Springs location is used at times by the Forest Service as summer crew station for surveys and firefighting.  Buildings include crew cabins, shower and bath house, cafeteria, barn, and house for staff.

Gallery

References

Unincorporated communities in Coconino County, Arizona
Kaibab National Forest
Unincorporated communities in Arizona